Sukhe may refer to:

 Sukhe (rapper), Indian singer-songwriter and music producer
 Sukhe (unit), a currency of the Mongol Empire

See also
 Sükhbaatar (disambiguation) (aka Sukhe-Bator, literally axe hero)
 Sukh (disambiguation)